Execution by elephant was a method of capital punishment in South and Southeast Asia, particularly in India, where Asian elephants were used to crush, dismember or torture captives in public executions. The animals were trained to kill victims immediately or to torture them slowly over a prolonged period. Most commonly employed by royalty, the elephants were used to signify both the ruler's power of life and death over his subjects and his ability to control wild animals.

The sight of elephants executing captives was recorded in contemporary journals and accounts of life in Asia by European travellers. The practice was eventually suppressed by the European colonial powers that colonised the region in the 18th and 19th centuries. While primarily confined to Asia, the practice was occasionally used by Western and African powers, such as Ancient Rome and Carthage, particularly to deal with mutinous soldiers.

Cultural aspects 
Historically, the elephants were under the constant control of a driver or mahout, thus enabling a ruler to grant a last-minute reprieve and display merciful qualities. Several such exercises of mercy are recorded in various Asian kingdoms. The kings of Siam trained their elephants to roll the convicted person "about the ground rather slowly so that he is not badly hurt". The Mughal Emperor Akbar is said to have "used this technique to chastise 'rebels' and then in the end the prisoners, presumably much chastened, were given their lives". On one occasion, Akbar was recorded to have had a man thrown to the elephants to suffer five days of such treatment before pardoning him. Elephants were occasionally used in trial by ordeal in which the condemned prisoner was released if he managed to fend off the elephant.

The use of elephants in such fashion went beyond the common royal power to dispense life and death. Elephants have long been used as symbols of royal authority (and still are in some places, such as Thailand, where white elephants are held in reverence). Their use as instruments of state power sent the message that the ruler was able to preside over very powerful creatures who were under total command. The ruler was thus seen as maintaining a moral and spiritual domination over wild beasts, adding to their authority and mystique among subjects.

Geographical scope

Asian powers

Southeast Asia 
Elephants were used for execution in Burma, the Malay Peninsula and Brunei in the pre-modern period as well as in the kingdom of Champa. In Siam, elephants were trained to throw the condemned into the air before trampling them to death. There exists an account in the 1560s of men being trampled to death by elephants in Ayutthaya due to their unruly behaviour. Alexander Hamilton provides the following account from Siam:

The journal of John Crawfurd records another method of execution by elephant in the kingdom of Cochinchina (modern south Vietnam), where he served as a British envoy in 1821. Crawfurd recalls an event where "the criminal is tied to a stake, and [Excellency's favourite] elephant runs down upon him and crushes him to death."

South Asia

India 

Hindu and Muslim rulers in India executed tax evaders, rebels and enemy soldiers alike "under the feet of elephants". The Hindu Manu Smriti or Laws of Manu, written sometime between 200 BCE and 200 CE, prescribed execution by elephants for a number of offences. If property was stolen, for instance, "the king should have any thieves caught in connection with its disappearance executed by an elephant." For example, in 1305, the sultan of Delhi turned the deaths of Mongol prisoners into public entertainment by having them crushed by elephants.

During the Mughal era, "it was a common mode of execution in those days to have the offender trampled underfoot by an elephant." Captain Alexander Hamilton, writing in 1727, described how the Mughal ruler Shah Jahan ordered an offending military commander to be carried "to the Elephant Garden, and there to be executed by an Elephant, which is reckoned to be a shameful and terrible Death". The Mughal Emperor Humayun ordered the crushing by elephant of an imam he mistakenly believed to be critical of his reign. Some monarchs also adopted this form of execution for their own entertainment. The emperor Jahangir, another Mughal emperor, is said to have ordered a huge number of criminals to be crushed for his amusement. The French traveler François Bernier, who witnessed such executions, recorded his dismay at the pleasure that the emperor derived from this cruel punishment. Nor was crushing the only method used by the Mughals' execution elephants; in the Mughal sultanate of Delhi, elephants were trained to slice prisoners to pieces "with pointed blades fitted to their tusks".
The Muslim traveler Ibn Battuta, visiting Delhi in the 1330s, has left the following eyewitness account of this particular type of execution by elephants:

Other Indian polities also carried out executions by elephant. The Maratha Chatrapati  Sambhaji ordered this form of death for a number of conspirators, including the Maratha official Anaji Datto in the late seventeenth century. Another Maratha leader, the general Santaji, inflicted the punishment for breaches in military discipline. The contemporary historian Khafi Khan reported that "for a trifling offense he [Santaji] would cast a man under the feet of an elephant."

The early-19th-century writer Robert Kerr relates how the king of Goa "keeps certain elephants for the execution of malefactors. When one of these is brought forth to dispatch a criminal, if his keeper desires that the offender be destroyed speedily, this vast creature will instantly crush him to atoms under his foot; but if desired to torture him, will break his limbs successively, as men are broken on the wheel." The naturalist Georges-Louis Leclerc, Comte de Buffon cited this flexibility of purpose as evidence that elephants were capable of "human reasoning, [rather] than a simple, natural instinct".

Such executions were often held in public as a warning to any who may transgress. To that end, many of the elephants were especially large, often weighing in excess of nine tons. The executions were intended to be, and often were, gruesome. They were sometimes preceded by torture publicly inflicted by the same elephant used for the execution. An account of one such torture-and-execution at Baroda in 1814 has been preserved in The Percy Anecdotes:

The use of elephants as executioners continued well into the latter half of the 19th century. During an expedition to central India in 1868, Louis Rousselet described the execution of a criminal by an elephant. A sketch depicting the execution showed the condemned being forced to place his head upon a pedestal, and then being held there while an elephant crushed his head underfoot. The sketch was made into a woodcut and printed in "Le Tour du Monde", a widely circulated French journal of travel and adventure, as well as foreign journals such as Harper's Weekly.

The growing power of the British Empire led to the decline and eventual end of elephant executions in India. Writing in 1914, Eleanor Maddock noted that in Kashmir, since the arrival of Europeans, "many of the old customs are disappearing – and one of these is the dreadful custom of the execution of criminals by an elephant trained for the purpose and which was known by the hereditary name of 'Gunga Rao'."

Sri Lanka 

Elephants were widely used across the Indian subcontinent and South Asia as a method of execution. The English sailor Robert Knox, writing in 1681, described a method of execution by elephant which he had witnessed while being held captive in Sri Lanka. Knox says the elephants he witnessed had their tusks fitted with "sharp Iron with a socket with three edges". After impaling the victim's body with its tusks, the elephant would "then tear it in pieces, and throw it limb from limb".

The 19th-century traveler James Emerson Tennent comments that "a Kandyan [Sri Lankan] chief, who was witness to such scenes, has assured us that the elephant never once applied his tusks, but, placing his foot on the prostrate victim, plucked off his limbs in succession by a sudden movement of his trunk." Knox's book depicts exactly this method of execution in a famous drawing, An Execution by an Eliphant.

Writing in 1850, the British diplomat Henry Charles Sirr described a visit to one of the elephants that had been used by Sri Vikrama Rajasinha, the last king of Kandy, to execute criminals. Crushing by elephant had been abolished by the British after they annexed the Kingdom of Kandy in 1815 but the king's execution elephant was still alive and evidently remembered its former duties. Sirr comments:

West Asia 
During the medieval period, executions by elephants were used by several West Asian imperial powers, including the Byzantine, Sassanid, Seljuq and Timurid empires. When the Sassanid king Khosrau II, who had a harem of 3,000 wives and 12,000 female slaves, demanded as a wife Hadiqah, the daughter of the Christian Arab Na'aman, Na'aman refused to permit his Christian daughter to enter the harem of a Zoroastrian; for this refusal, he was trampled to death by an elephant.

The practice appears to have been adopted in parts of the Muslim Middle East. Rabbi Petachiah of Ratisbon, a 12th-century Jewish traveler, reported an execution by this means during his stay in Seljuk-ruled northern Mesopotamia (modern Iraq):

Western empires 
Perdiccas, who became regent of Macedon on the death of Alexander the Great in 323 BC, had mutineers from the faction of Meleager thrown to the elephants to be crushed in the city of Babylon. The Roman writer Quintus Curtius Rufus relates the story in his Historiae Alexandri Magni:

Similarly, the Roman writer Valerius Maximus records how the general Lucius Aemilius Paulus Macedonicus "after King Perseus was vanquished [in 167 BC], for the same fault (desertion) threw men under elephants to be trampled ... And indeed military discipline needs this kind of severe and abrupt punishment, because this is how strength of arms stands firm, which, when it falls away from the right course, will be subverted."

Africa
In 240 BC, a Carthaginian army led by Hamilcar Barca was fighting a coalition of mutinous soldiers and rebellious African cities led by Spendius. After losing a battle when a force of Numidian cavalry deserted to the Carthaginians, Spendius had 700 Carthaginian prisoners tortured to death. From this point, prisoners taken by the Carthaginians were trampled to death by their war elephants. This unusual ferocity caused the conflict to be termed the "Truceless War".

There are fewer records of elephants being used as straightforward executioners for the civil population. One such example is mentioned by Josephus and the deuterocanonical book of 3 Maccabees in connection with the Egyptian Jews, though the story is likely apocryphal. 3 Maccabees describes an attempt by Ptolemy IV Philopator (ruled 221–204 BC) to enslave and brand Egypt's Jews with the symbol of Dionysus. When the majority of the Jews resisted, the king is said to have rounded them up and ordered them to be trampled on by elephants. The mass execution was ultimately thwarted, supposedly by the intervention of angels, following which Ptolemy took an altogether more forgiving attitude towards his Jewish subjects.

References

Sources 

 Allsen, Thomas T. "The Royal Hunt in Eurasian History". University of Pennsylvania Press, May 2006. 
 Chevers, Norman. "A Manual of Medical Jurisprudence for Bengal and the Northwestern Provinces". Carbery, 1856.
 Collins, John Joseph. "Between Athens and Jerusalem: Jewish Identity in the Hellenistic Diaspora". Wm. B. Eerdmans Publishing Company, October 1999. 
 
 Eraly, Abraham. "Mughal Throne: The Saga of India's Great Emperors", Phoenix House, 2005. 
 
 Hamilton, Alexander. "A New Account of the East Indies: Being the Observations and Remarks of Capt. Alexander Hamilton, from the Year 1688 to 1723". C. Hitch and A. Millar, 1744.
 Kerr, Robert. "A General History and Collection of Voyages and Travels". W. Blackwood, 1811.
 Lee, Samuel (trans). "The Travels of Ibn Batuta". Oriental Translation Committee, 1829.
 
 Olivelle, Patrick (trans). "The Law Code of Manu". Oxford University Press, 2004. 
 Schimmel, Annemarie. "The Empire of the Great Mughals: History, Art and Culture". Reaktion Books, February 2004. 
 Tennent, Emerson James. "Ceylon: An Account of the Island Physical, Historical and Topographical". Longman, Green, Longman, and Roberts, 1860.

Elephants
Elephants in Indian culture
Execution methods
Social history of India
Social history of Africa
History of South Asia
History of Southeast Asia
History of Africa
Torture
Deaths due to elephant attacks
Animal training
Naravas
Naravas
Naravas
Livestock